St. Sebastian's Church, Enderamulla is a Roman Catholic church in the Archdiocese of Colombo, Sri Lanka. It is located in Enderamulla, Wattala. The church was established in 1891. After being a co-parish with Dalugama (1879-1903) and Kirimetiyagara (1903-1934), it was declared as an independent parish in 1934.

A tiny fragment of St. Sebastian's forearm bone is preserved in a special reliquary, which is located together with the Monstrance in a glass chamber inside the eucharistic chapel on the left side of the main church building.

Parish priests

1855 - 1879
Note: Enderamulla was yet not an official parish

Rev.Fr. Constantine Nevis
Rev.Fr. Mathias Caitano 
Rev.Fr. Brucio
Rev.Fr. Santangelo
Rev.Fr. Kanjamanathan
Rev.Fr. Mawar

1879 - 1903
Note: Enderamulla was connected with Dalugama parish in 1879

1903 - 1934
Note: Enderamulla was connected with Kirimetiyagara parish in 1903

1934 - 1983
Note: Enderamulla became an independent parish in 1934

References

Churches in Gampaha
Roman Catholic churches completed in 1891
1891 establishments in Ceylon